Wilsie may refer to:
Wilsie, West Virginia
Shawn Wilsie